Aleksandr Sergeyevich Grunichev (born 8 August 2003) is a Russian football player. He plays for FC Khimik Dzerzhinsk.

Club career
He made his debut for the main team of FC Nizhny Novgorod on 22 September 2021 in a Russian Cup game against FC Dynamo Barnaul.

Career statistics

References

External links
 
 
 

2003 births
Living people
Russian footballers
Association football midfielders
FC Nizhny Novgorod (2015) players
FC Khimik Dzerzhinsk players